Lawrence Lartey (born 23 March 1994) is a Ghanaian footballer who plays as a defender for Hawassa Kenema and the Ghana national team.

Club career

Nania FC
Lartey began his football career with F.C. Nania from Legon, Greater Accra Region. He helped the club to win the reintroduced Ghanaian FA Cup by defeating Asante Kotoko, while also winning the Ghana Super Cup by defeating Berekum Chelsea in 2011. After three seasons he transferred to AshantiGold from Obuasi.

AshantiGold
He spent four seasons with AshGold, helping the team secure their fourth Ghanaian Premier League title in his final year with the club before relocating to South Africa and signing with Ajax Cape Town.

Ajax Cape Town
On 16 November 2015 it was announced that Lartey had signed with South African Premier Soccer League side Ajax Cape Town. He made 13 appearances in his first season with the club under manager Roger De Sá.

Club Africain
Tunisian side Club Africain announced the signing of Lartey on July 11, 2017, with Lartey becoming the 2nd Ghanaian to sign with the club after Seidu Salifu. He signed a 3-year contract as a free agent following the expiration of his contract with Ajax CT.

Hawassa City 
Lartey signed a one-year contract with two time Ethiopian Premier League champions Hawassa City S.C. at the start of the 2017-18 season. In August 2018 the club announced they had come to an agreement with Lartey on a one-year extension.

International career

Ghana Youth teams
Lartey plays for the Ghana national U20 team. He has captained Ghana at both the 2013 Africa U-20 Cup of Nations, where his team finished as runners-up to Egypt U20, losing the final 5–6 on penalties, as well as the 2013 FIFA U-20 World Cup where he captained Ghana to a third-place finish in Turkey. In 2014, he received his first call-up for the under-23 national team.

Ghana Senior team
On 1 September 2015, Lartey made his debut for the senior team of Ghana, playing the full 90-minutes in a friendly match against the Congo which ended in a 3–2 away win in Brazzaville.

Honours

Club
Nania FC
 Ghanaian FA Cup (1): 2011
 Ghana Super Cup (1): 2011

AshantiGold
 Ghanaian Premier League (1): 2014–15

International
Ghana under-20
 FIFA U-20 World Cup Third place: 2013
 Africa U-20 Cup of Nations Runners-up: 2013

References

1994 births
Living people
Ghanaian footballers
Ghana international footballers
Ghanaian expatriate footballers
Association football defenders
Ashanti Gold SC players
Club Africain players
Cape Town Spurs F.C. players
Ghana Premier League players
Expatriate soccer players in South Africa
Expatriate footballers in Tunisia
Expatriate footballers in Ethiopia
Ghanaian expatriate sportspeople in South Africa
Ghanaian expatriate sportspeople in Tunisia
Ghanaian expatriate sportspeople in Ethiopia
African Games gold medalists for Ghana
African Games medalists in football
Competitors at the 2015 African Games